Yinchuan Metro is a proposed urban rail network in Yinchuan, the capital of Ningxia, in Northwest China.

Background 
Yinchuan is the capital and largest city of Ningxia Hui Autonomous Region. It has a population of over 2 million. The city has experienced a significant growth in population and economic importance over the past decades, partly because of China's Western Development strategy.

Transport within and to Yinchuan has lagged behind the rest of China and nearby provincial capitals. Until completion of the Yinchuan–Xi'an high-speed railway in 2020, the city did not have any high-speed rail connections.

In 2018 a 9.7 km monorail long loop line in Yinchuan's Flower Expo Garden opened, using BYD Skyrail technology.

Planned network 
The proposed network is to consist of 6 lines totaling . The plans were first announced in 2016.

 Line 1 will form an east–west backbone of the urban area, starting from Xixia Passenger Station planned and ending at Yinchuan East railway station.
 Line 2 will form a north–south backbone of the urban area, to run from Yuanbao Lake in Fengdeng to Wangyin Road in Wangyuan.
 Line 3 will form a northeast to southwest backbone, starting from Helan County and ending in the Yinchuan Economic Development Zone.
 Line 4 will be a parallel east–west line in the northern part of the city. Together with Line 3, it will form a loop around the city center. It will run from Yinchuan Economic Development Zone to Baliqiao station.
 The Binning Line will be an suburban rail line, part of the China Railway network to connect the city center to Binhe New Area and Yinchuan Hedong International Airport.
 The Yonghe Line will use light rail technology and be a north–south suburban line to run from Helan County to Yongning County, with possible extensions to Lingwu, Litong District, Pingluo County and Shahu.

See also 
 Xining Metro
 Lanzhou Metro

References 

Proposed public transport in China
Yinchuan